Siswa is a village in Araria district, Bihar, India. The population was 1,835 at the 2011 Indian census.

Education
UMS Siswa School, a coeducational primary school, is located in Siswa.

See also
List of villages in Araria district

References

Villages in Araria district